Klyukvenny (masculine), Klyukvennaya (feminine), or Klyukvennoye (neuter) is the name of several rural localities in Russia.

Modern localities
Klyukvenny, Altai Krai, a settlement in Gordeyevsky Selsoviet of Troitsky District of Altai Krai; 
Klyukvenny, Moscow Oblast, a settlement in Ogudnevskoye Rural Settlement of Shchyolkovsky District of Moscow Oblast
Klyukvennoye, Kaliningrad Oblast, a settlement in Krasnotorovsky Rural Okrug of Zelenogradsky District of Kaliningrad Oblast
Klyukvennoye, Kurgan Oblast, a selo in Saratovsky Selsoviet of Makushinsky District of Kurgan Oblast
Klyukvennaya, Kurgan Oblast, a village in Medvedsky Selsoviet of Shchuchansky District of Kurgan Oblast

Renamed localities
Klyukvennaya, former name of Uyar, a town in Uyarsky District of Krasnoyarsk Krai